Smith Township is one of nine townships in Whitley County, Indiana, United States. As of the 2010 census, its population was 5,327 and it contained 2,244 housing units.

Geography
Lakes in this township include Blue Lake, Devil Lake, Devils Lake and Little Lake. The stream of Mud Run runs through this township.

Cities and towns
 Churubusco

Unincorporated towns
 Blue Lake
 Collins
(This list is based on USGS data and may include former settlements.)

Adjacent townships
 Green Township, Noble County (north)
 Swan Township, Noble County (northeast)
 Eel River Township, Allen County (east)
 Lake Township, Allen County (southeast)
 Union Township (south)
 Thorncreek Township (west)
 Noble Township, Noble County (northwest)

Cemeteries
The township contains three cemeteries: Concord, Garrison and Jeffries.

Major highways
  U.S. Route 33
  Indiana State Road 205

Education
Smith Township residents may obtain a free library card from the Churubusco Public Library.

References
 U.S. Board on Geographic Names (GNIS)
 United States Census Bureau cartographic boundary files

External links
 Indiana Township Association
 United Township Association of Indiana

Townships in Whitley County, Indiana
Townships in Indiana